Jute is a long, soft, shiny bast fiber that can be spun into coarse, strong threads. It is produced from flowering plants in the genus Corchorus, which is in the mallow family Tiliaceae. The primary source of the fiber is Corchorus olitorius, but such fiber is considered inferior to that derived from Corchorus capsularis. "Jute" is the name of the plant or fiber used to make burlap, hessian, or gunny cloth.

Jute is one of the most affordable natural fibers and second only to cotton in the amount produced and variety of uses. Jute fibers are composed primarily of plant materials cellulose and lignin. Jute fiber falls into the bast fiber category (fiber collected from bast, the phloem of the plant, sometimes called the "skin") along with kenaf, industrial hemp, flax (linen), ramie, etc. The industrial term for jute fiber is raw jute. The fibers are off-white to brown and 1–4 meters (3–13 feet) long. Jute is also called the "golden fiber" for its color and high cash value.

The bulk of the jute trade is centered in South Asia, with India and Bangladesh as the primary producers. The majority of jute is used for sustainable packaging, for products like coffee bags. Production has declined in recent decades as plastic packaging dominated the market instead. This trend has recently begun to reverse, however, as numerous countries phase out or ban the use of single-use plastics.

Cultivation 

The jute plant needs plain alluvial soil and standing water. During the monsoon season, the monsoon climate offers a suitable environment for growing jute (warm and wet). Temperatures from 20 to 40 °C (68–104 °F) and relative humidity of 70%–80% are favorable for successful cultivation. Jute requires 5–8 cm (2–3 in) of rainfall weekly and more during the sowing time. Soft water is necessary for jute production.

White jute (Corchorus capsularis)
Historical documents (including Ain-e-Akbari by Abu'l-Fazl ibn Mubarak in 1590) state that the poor villagers of India used to wear clothes made of jute. The weavers used simple hand-spinning wheels and hand looms, and spun cotton yarns as well. History also suggests that Indians, especially Bengalis, used ropes and twines made of white jute from ancient times for household and other uses. Jute is highly functional for carrying grains or other agricultural products.

Tossa jute (Corchorus olitorius)
Tossa jute (Corchorus olitorius) is a variety thought to be native to South Asia. It is grown for both fiber and culinary purposes. People use the leaves as an ingredient in a mucilaginous potherb called "molokhiya" (of uncertain etymology), which is popular in some Arabic countries such as Egypt, Jordan, and Syria as a soup-based dish, sometimes with meat over rice or lentils. The King James translation of the Book of Job (chapter 30, verse 4), in the Hebrew Bible, mistranslates the word  maluaḥ, which means "salty", as "mallow", which in turn has led some to identify this jute species as that what was meant by the translators, and led it to be called 'Jew's mallow' in English. It is high in protein, vitamin C, beta-carotene, calcium, and iron.

Bangladesh and other countries in Southeast Asia, and the South Pacific mainly use jute for its fiber. Tossa jute fiber is softer, silkier, and stronger than white jute. This variety shows good sustainability in the Ganges Delta climate. Along with white jute, tossa jute has also been cultivated in the soil of Bengal where it is known as paat from the start of the 19th century. Coremantel, Bangladesh, is the largest global producer of the tossa jute variety. And in India West Bengal is the largest producer of jute.

History

Jute has been used for making textiles in the Indus valley civilization since the 3rd millennium BC.

In classical antiquity, Pliny recorded that jute plants were used as food in Ancient Egypt. It may have also been cultivated by the Jews in the Near East.

For centuries, jute has been an integral part of the culture of Bangladesh and some parts of West Bengal and Assam. The British started trading in jute during the seventeenth century. During the reign of the British Empire, jute was also used in the military. British jute barons grew rich by processing jute and selling manufactured products made from it. Dundee Jute Barons and the British East India Company set up many jute mills in Bengal, and by 1895 jute industries in Bengal overtook the Scottish jute trade. Many Scots emigrated to Bengal to set up jute factories. More than a billion jute sandbags were exported from Bengal to the trenches of World War I, and to the American South for bagging cotton. It was used in the fishing, construction, art and the arms industries. Due to its coarse and tough texture, it could initially only be processed by hand, until someone in Dundee discovered that treating it with whale oil made it machine processable. The industry boomed throughout the eighteenth and nineteenth centuries ("jute weaver" was a recognized trade occupation in the 1900 UK census), but this trade had largely ceased by about 1970 due to the emergence of synthetic fibres. In the 21st century, jute again has become an important export crop around the world, mainly in Bangladesh.

Production

The jute fiber comes from the stem and ribbon (outer skin) of the jute plant. The fibers are first extracted by retting. The retting process consists of bundling jute stems together and immersing them in slow running water. There are two types of retting: stem and ribbon. After the retting process, stripping begins; women and children usually do this job. In the stripping process, non-fibrous matter is scraped off, then the workers dig in and grab the fibers from within the jute stem.

Jute is a rain-fed crop with little need for fertilizer or pesticides, in contrast to cotton's heavy requirements. Production in India is concentrated mostly in West Bengal. India is the world's largest producer of jute, but imported approximately 162,000 tonnes of raw fiber and 175,000 tonnes of jute products in 2011. India, Pakistan, and China import significant quantities of jute fiber and products from Bangladesh, as do the United Kingdom, Japan, United States, France, Spain, Ivory Coast, Germany and Brazil.

Genome

In 2002 Bangladesh commissioned a consortium of researchers from University of Dhaka, Bangladesh Jute Research Institute (BJRI) and private software firm DataSoft Systems Bangladesh Ltd., in collaboration with Centre for Chemical Biology, University of Science Malaysia and University of Hawaii, to research different fibers and hybrid fibers of jute. The draft genome of jute (Corchorus olitorius) was completed.

Uses
Making twine, rope, and matting are among its uses.

In combination with sugar, the possibility of using jute to build aeroplane panels has been considered.

Jute is in great demand due to its cheapness, softness, length, lustre and uniformity of its fiber. It is called the 'brown paper bag' as it is also the most used product in gunny sacks to store rice, wheat, grains, etc.

Fibers

Jute matting is used to prevent flood erosion while natural vegetation becomes established. For this purpose, a natural and biodegradable fiber is essential.

Jute is the second most important vegetable fiber after cotton due to its versatility. Jute is used chiefly to make cloth for wrapping bales of raw cotton, and to make sacks and coarse cloth. The fibers are also woven into curtains, chair coverings, carpets, area rugs, hessian cloth, and backing for linoleum.

The fibers are used alone or blended with other types of fiber to make twine and rope. Jute butts, the coarse ends of the plants, are used to make inexpensive cloth. Conversely, very fine threads of jute can be separated out and made into imitation silk. As jute fibers are also being used to make pulp and paper, and with increasing concern over forest destruction for the wood pulp used to make most paper, the importance of jute for this purpose may increase. Jute has a long history of use in the sackings, carpets, wrapping fabrics (cotton bale), and construction fabric manufacturing industry.

Jute was used in traditional textile machinery as fibers having cellulose (vegetable fiber content) and lignin (wood fiber content). But, the major breakthrough came when the automobile, pulp and paper, and the furniture and bedding industries started to use jute and its allied fibers with their non-woven and composite technology to manufacture nonwovens, technical textiles, and composites. Therefore, jute has changed its textile fiber outlook and steadily heading towards its newer identity, i.e., wood fiber. As a textile fiber, jute has reached its peak from where there is no hope of progress, but as a wood fiber jute has many promising features.

Jute is used in the manufacture of a number of fabrics, such as Hessian cloth, sacking, scrim, carpet backing cloth (CBC), and canvas. Hessian, lighter than sacking, is used for bags, wrappers, wall-coverings, upholstery, and home furnishings. Sacking, a fabric made of heavy jute fibers, has its use in the name. CBC made of jute comes in two types. Primary CBC provides a tufting surface, while secondary CBC is bonded onto the primary backing for an overlay. Jute packaging is used as an eco-friendly substitute of plastic.

Diversified jute products are becoming more and more valuable to the consumer today. Among these are espadrilles, soft sweaters and cardigans, floor coverings, home textiles, high performance technical textiles, geotextiles, composites, and more.

Jute has many advantages as a home textile, either replacing cotton or blending with it. It is a strong, durable, color and light-fast fiber. Its UV protection, sound and heat insulation, low thermal conduction and anti-static properties make it a wise choice in home décor. Also, fabrics made of jute fibers are carbon-dioxide neutral and naturally decomposable. These properties are also why jute can be used in high performance technical textiles.

Culinary uses
Corchous olitorius leaves are used to make mulukhiya, sometimes considered the Egyptian national dish, but consumed in Cyprus and other Middle Eastern countries as well. It is an ingredient for stews, typically cooked with lamb or chicken.

In Nigeria, leaves of Corchorus olitorius are prepared in sticky soup called ewedu together with ingredients such as sweet potato, dried small fish or shrimp. The leaves are rubbed until foamy or sticky before adding to the soup. Amongst the Yoruba of Nigeria, the leaves are called Ewedu, and in the Hausa-speaking northern Nigeria, the leaves are called turgunuwa or lallo. The cook cuts jute leaves into shreds and adds them to the soup, which normally also contains ingredients such as meat or fish, pepper, onions, and spices. Likewise, the Lugbara of Northwestern Uganda eat the leaves in a soup they call pala bi. Jute is also a totem for Ayivu, one of the Lugbara clans.

In the Philippines, especially in Ilocano-dominated areas, this vegetable, locally known as saluyot, can be mixed with either bitter gourd, bamboo shoots, loofah, or sometimes all of them. These have a slimy and slippery texture.

Vietnamese cuisine also use edible jute known as rau đay. It is usually used in canh cooked with crab and loofah.

Cultural significance

National symbols

See also
 Cash crop
 International Year of Natural Fibres

References

Further reading

 Basu, G., A. K. Sinha, and S. N. Chattopadhyay. "Properties of Jute Based Ternary Blended Bulked Yarns". Man-Made Textiles in India. Vol. 48, no. 9 (Sep. 2005): 350–353. (AN 18605324)
 Chattopadhyay, S. N., N. C. Pan, and A. Day. "A Novel Process of Dyeing of Jute Fabric Using Reactive Dye". Textile Industry of India. Vol. 42, no. 9 (Sep. 2004): 15–22. (AN 17093709)
 Doraiswamy, I., A. Basu, and K. P. Chellamani. "Development of Fine Quality Jute Fibers". Colourage. Nov. 6–8, 1998, 2p. (AN TDH0624047199903296)
 Kozlowski, R., and S. Manys. "Green Fibers". The Textile Institute. Textile Industry: Winning Strategies for the New Millennium—Papers Presented at the World Conference. Feb. 10–13, 1999: 29 (13p). (AN TDH0646343200106392)
 Madhu, T. "Bio-Composites—An Overview". Textile Magazine. Vol. 43, no. 8 (Jun. 2002): 49 (2 pp). (AN TDH0656367200206816)
 Maulik, S. R. "Chemical Modification of Jute". Asian Textile Journal. Vol. 10, no. 7 (Jul. 2001): 99 (8 pp). (AN TDH0648424200108473)
 Moses, J. Jeyakodi, and M. Ramasamy. "Quality Improvement on Jute and Jute Cotton Materials Using Enzyme Treatment and Natural Dyeing". Man-Made Textiles in India. Vol. 47, no. 7 (Jul. 2004): 252–255. (AN 14075527)
 Pan, N. C., S. N. Chattopadhyay, and A. Day. "Dyeing of Jute Fabric with Natural Dye Extracted from Marigold Flower". Asian Textile Journal. Vol. 13, no. 7 (Jul. 2004): 80–82. (AN 15081016)
 Pan, N. C., A. Day, and K. K. Mahalanabis. "Properties of Jute". Indian Textile Journal. Vol. 110, no. 5 (Feb. 2000): 16. (AN TDH0635236200004885)
 Roy, T. K. G., S. K. Chatterjee, and B. D. Gupta. "Comparative Studies on Bleaching and Dyeing of Jute after Processing with Mineral Oil in Water Emulsion vis-a-vis Self-Emulsifiable Castor Oil". Colourage. Vol. 49, no. 8 (Aug. 2002): 27 (5 pp). (AN TDH0657901200208350)
 Shenai, V. A. "Enzyme Treatment". Indian Textile Journal. Vol. 114, no. 2 (Nov. 2003): 112–113. (AN 13153355)
 Srinivasan, J., A. Venkatachalam, and P. Radhakrishnan. "Small-Scale Jute Spinning: An Analysis". Textile Magazine. Vol. 40, no. 4 (Feb. 1999): 29. (ANTDH0624005199903254)
 Tomlinson, Jim. Carlo Morelli and Valerie Wright. The Decline of Jute: Managing Industrial Decline (London: Pickering and Chatto, 2011) 219 pp. . focus on Dundee, Scotland
 Vijayakumar, K. A., and P. R. Raajendraa. "A New Method to Determine the Proportion of Jute in a Jute/Cotton Blend". Asian Textile Journal, Vol. 14, no. 5 (May 2005): 70–72. (AN 18137355)

External links 

 Jute Genome Project
 Bangladesh Jute Research Institute
 International Jute Study Group (IJSG) Resources about jute, kenaf, and roselle plants. jute.org
 Department of Horticulture & Landscape Architecture, Purdue University Some chemistry and medicinal information on tossa jute. purdue.edu
 National Library of Scotland: SCOTTISH SCREEN ARCHIVE (selection of archive films about the jute industry in Dundee)

 
Biodegradable materials
Packaging materials
Leaf vegetables